The 12309 / 12310 Rajendra Nagar-New Delhi Tejas Rajdhani Express  is a Semi-High Speed Fully AC Train that connects Patna with and Delhi.

History
This Train was originally introduced in the Annual Railway Budget of 1996–97 as a daily Rajdhani Express from New Delhi to Patna via Lucknow. Later it was rerouted to run via Prayagraj. In 1997, the pantry car service was introduced.

From 1st September 2021, the train LHB Rajdhani Rakes are replaced with LHB Tejas Sleeper Rakes.

Service 
It runs daily. It operates as train number 12309 from Rajendra Nagar (Patna) to New Delhi railway station and as train number 12310 in the reverse direction. It covers a distance of 1001 kilometres in each direction however it takes 12 hours 5 minutes when operating as train number 12310 at an average speed of 83 km/h (including halts) while its return journey takes 12 h 30 min at an average speed of 80  km/h (including halts) as train number 12309. Later on with the completion of the construction of the Rajendra Nagar Terminal railway station, it was terminated from Patna Junction to here.

It has 4 halts in either direction at Patna Junction, PT Deen Dayal Upadhaya Junction, and .This is the only Rajdhani Express having ISO certification.

Coach composition

References

Transport in Patna
Transport in Delhi
Rajdhani Express trains
Rail transport in Bihar
Rail transport in Delhi
Rail transport in Uttar Pradesh
Railway services introduced in 1996